Tah is a small town and rural commune in the Tarfaya Province of the Laâyoune-Sakia El Hamra region of Morocco. At the time of the 2014 census, the commune had a total population of 1,516 people.

References

Populated places in Laâyoune-Sakia El Hamra
Tarfaya